Orovica (Serbian Cyrillic: Оровица) is a mountain in central Serbia, near the town of Lučani. Its highest peak has an elevation of 856 meters above sea level.

References

Mountains of Serbia